Rune Flodman (1 April 1926 – 21 February 2014) was a Swedish sports shooter. He competed in the trap event at the 1964 Summer Olympics.

References

External links
 

1926 births
2014 deaths
Swedish male sport shooters
Olympic shooters of Sweden
Shooters at the 1964 Summer Olympics
Sportspeople from Örebro County
20th-century Swedish people